I. indicus' may refer to:

 Indjapyx indicus, a species of forcepstail
 Indolestes indicus'', a species of spreadwing

See also
 Indicus (disambiguation)